The 2023 FIVB Volleyball Women's U21 World Championship will be the 22nd edition of the FIVB Volleyball Women's U21 World Championship, contested by the women's national teams under the age of 20 of the members of the  (FIVB), the sport's global governing body. It will be held in Mexico from 17 to 26 August 2023.

This will be the first edition with under-21 national teams after FIVB decided, in March 2022, to move the age category of the women's U20 championship to U21 in order to align it with the Men's U21 World Championship.

Italy are the defending champions.

Host selection
On 2 June 2022, FIVB opened the bidding process for member associations whose countries were interested in hosting one of the four Age Group World Championships in 2023 (i.e., U19 Boys' and Girls' World Championships and U21 Men's and Women's World Championships). The expression of interest of the member associations had to be submitted to FIVB by 29 July 2022, 18:00 CEST (UTC+2).

FIVB announced the hosts for its four Age Group World Championship on 24 January 2023, with Mexico being selected to host the 2023 Women's U21 World Championship. This will be the fifth time that Mexico hosts the FIVB Women's U21 World Championship having previously done so in 1981, 2009, 2017 and 2019.

Qualification
A total of 16 national teams qualified for the final tournament. In addition to Mexico who qualified automatically as the host, 10 other teams qualified through five separate continental competitions which were required to be held by 31 December 2022 at the latest. The remaining 5 teams entered via the Women's U21 FIVB World Ranking among the teams not yet qualified.

The slot allocation was setted as follow:
AVC (Asia & Oceania): 2
CAVB (Africa): 2
CEV (Europe): 2
CSV (South America): 2
NORCECA (North, Central America and Caribbean): 2
Host: 1
Top teams not yet qualified as per Women's U21 FIVB World Ranking: 5

See also
2023 FIVB Volleyball Girls' U19 World Championship
2023 FIVB Volleyball Boys' U19 World Championship
2023 FIVB Volleyball Men's U21 World Championship

References

FIVB Volleyball Women's U20 World Championship
FIVB Volleyball Women's U20 World Championship
World Championship U21
International volleyball competitions hosted by Mexico
Sport in Aguascalientes
Sport in Guanajuato
FIVB
FIVB